James Cerretani and Philipp Oswald were the defending champions but chose not to defend their title.

Máximo González and Fabrício Neis won the title after defeating Rameez Junaid and Ruan Roelofse 6–3, 7–6(7–4) in the final.

Seeds

Draw

References
 Main Draw

Marburg Open - Doubles
2017 Doubles